The Ufa Viceroyalty was a viceroyalty of the Russian Empire, with the largest city being Ufa.

The viceroyalty was created in 1781 which form the lands now known as the Republic of Bashkortostan, a republic within Russia. However, in 1796, the Ufa Viceroyalty was renamed to the Orenburg Governorate. It contained the administrative division of Sterlitamaksky Uyzeyd.

References 

Viceroyalties of the Russian Empire
History of Ufa
States and territories established in 1781
1781 establishments in the Russian Empire
1796 disestablishments in the Russian Empire